TRNA1Val (adenine37-N6)-methyltransferase (YfiC) is an enzyme with systematic name S-adenosyl-L-methionine:tRNA1Val (adenine37-N6)-methyltransferase. This enzyme catalyses the following chemical reaction

 S-adenosyl-L-methionine + adenine37 in tRNA1Val  S-adenosyl-L-homocysteine + N6-methyladenine37 in tRNA1Val

The enzyme specifically methylates adenine37 in tRNA1Val (anticodon cmo5UAC).

References

External links 
 

EC 2.1.1